Jerome Jordan Pollitt (born November 26, 1934) is an American art historian and educator. Pollitt is the Sterling Professor of Classical Archeology and History of Art Emeritus at Yale University.

Early life
Pollitt graduated from the Hotchkiss School in 1953. He then earned a Bachelor of Arts from Yale University in 1957 and a Doctor of Philosophy from Columbia University in 1963. Upon graduating from Yale, Pollitt became a Fulbright Scholar at the American School of Classical Studies at Athens. After returning to the United States, he was drafted and served a term in the United States Army before continuing his education at Columbia.

Career
While earning his doctorate at Columbia, Pollitt became an instructor at his alma mater, Yale, in 1962, becoming a full professor in 1973. Following that appointment, he also served as Editor-in-Chief of the American Journal of Archaeology from 1973 until 1977. Pollitt is one of a few Yale professors that have served as chair of two departments: art history and classics, in this case. As a result of his academic achievements, Pollitt was selected to succeed Keith Stewart Thomson as Dean of the Yale Graduate School of Arts and Sciences in 1986. He was replaced by Judith Rodin in 1991. In that year, Pollitt won the Wilbur Cross Medal. He was subsequently appointed as the John M. Schiff Professor of Classical Archaeology and History of Art in 1990, and named as the Sterling Professor of Classical Archeology and the History of Art in 1995. He was given the title of Emeritus upon retirement.

See also
List of Hotchkiss School alumni
List of Yale University people

References

External links
Yale University profile

1934 births
Living people
21st-century American historians
American art historians
American classical scholars
Hotchkiss School alumni
Yale University alumni
Columbia University alumni
Yale University faculty
Yale Sterling Professors